At least 27 people were killed in a triple suicide car bomb explosion, that hit roadblocks manned by loyalist forces in Aden, the largest city in southern Yemen, where several jihadist organizations are active. Two car bombs exploded in al-Shaab, west of Aden, and an ambulance exploded near a checkpoint in the center of the city of Mansoura, declared "provisional" capital of Yemen, since its resumption in July 2015 by pro-government forces, after their fight against the Shiite Houthi rebels. The Yemeni branch of the Islamic State of Iraq and the Levant claimed responsibility for the attack.

References

2016 murders in Yemen
ISIL terrorist incidents in Yemen
Mass murder in 2016
Suicide bombings in 2016
Terrorist incidents in Aden
Terrorist incidents in Yemen in 2016
Yemeni Civil War (2014–present)
Islamic terrorist incidents in 2016
March 2016 crimes in Asia
March 2016 events in Asia
21st century in Aden
Car and truck bombings in Yemen